Sawai (written: 沢井 lit. "swamp well") is a Japanese surname. Notable people with the surname include:

Gloria Sawai (1932–2011), American-Canadian author
Hikaru Sawai (born 1964), Japanese koto player and composer, son of Kazue and Tadao Sawai
Kazue Sawai (born 1941), Japanese koto player and composer
Kenichi Sawai (1903–1988), Japanese martial artist and army officer
Koji Sawai, Japanese anime director and artist
Miku Sawai (born 1993), Japanese musician
Miyuu Sawai (born 1987), Japanese actress
Ryosuke Sawai (born 1978), Japanese baseball player
Sawai Atsuhiro (born 1939), Japanese yoga practitioner
Shinichiro Sawai (born 1938), Japanese filmmaker
Tadao Sawai (1938–1997), Japanese koto player and composer
Yoshio Sawai (born 1977), Japanese manga artist

Japanese-language surnames